Ogbunka is a town in Orumba South Local Government Area of Anambra State, Nigeria.
It has five villages: Awuka, Umunobe, Akwuoba, Agbala and Isiokpu.

Villages 
Ogbunka comprises five villages - Isiokpu, Awuka, Agbala, Umunobe and Akwuoba.

Isiokpu Village
The people of this village are the descendant of Isisekpunti, Ogbu's first son. This village is at the centre of the community and it is bounded by the other villages. Hence, it does not share boundaries with any of the communities bordering Ogbunka. The people of this village play a significant role in deciding issues that affect the whole community. This village has two small clans called Umudiala and Umu-Echem kindreds; the population of this village contributes seven percentage of the overall population of the community. Sequel to the needs for protection and defence that permeated the ancient days, it was understood that the people of this village ceded their decision making rights otherwise called birth-right to Awuka village. In return, Awuka village undertook to defend and protect Isiokpu from all forms external aggression.

Awuka Village
These form the descendants of Onwuka, Ogbu's second son. It is located on the eastern side of the town and it shares boundaries with Owere-Ezukala and Awlaw communities. The village is thirty-five percentage of Ogbunka's population; this accords the village the status of the most populated village of the town. With their population advantage, the people of this village have produced virtually all the paramount rulers of the town since the 19th century A.D. The village produced great warriors that led the town to an array of victorious wars where they just overran their enemies. The village is broken down into thirteen administrative wards. The people of this village are easy-going, jovial and pretty big talkers.

Agbala Village
These are the descendants of Okparanaku, the third son of Ogbu. Geographically, this village hovers on western side of the town and it bounds the town with Umunze. Agbala village constitute ten percentage of the entire population of the town. For the purpose of governance, Agbala is divided into six administrative wards.

Umunobe Village
These are the descendants of Nobe, Ogbu's fourth son. Simply put, Umunobe means children of Nobe. This village is located on the northern side of the community and borders the town with Awlaw, Eziagu, Nawfija, Ufuma and Umunze communities. It has the largest land mass amongst other communities and constitutes thirty percent of the population of the community. The people of this village are known for their gallant display of bravery and enviable spirit of oneness. This is evident in the role that they played during the attempted invasion of Awuka village by Owere Ezukala community, the people of this village led the defence that helped to repel the roaring Owerre Ezukala people. Geographically, this village is kind of separate from the rest of the community, and has its own primary school, first-generations churches and the likes. Administratively, Umunobe has ten wards.

Akwuoba Village
The descendants of Oba, Ogbu's last son form this village. This village is located on the southern side of the community. This village borders the community with Eziama and Nkerefi communities. The village constitutes approximately eighteen percent of the whole population of the community. This village was known for their Agbara shrine(oracle) which was consulted by far and wide seeking explanations/solutions to mysterious circumstances/problems. Akwuoba has six administrative wards. The average Akwuoba man is easy going and does not keep malice.

External links
Ogbunka on the web
Ogbunka on the map

Populated places in Anambra State